This is a list of mayors of Cordova in the state of Alaska in the United States. The City of Cordova was incorporated on July 8, 1909.

References

Cordova